Richard Rafael Van Veen (born December 14, 1980) is an American entrepreneur and the Head of Global Creative Strategy at Facebook. Van Veen co-founded the comedy brand and humor website CollegeHumor and the video sharing website Vimeo. He was also CEO of Notional, a television production company spun out of CollegeHumor.

Early life and education
Born in Lutherville-Timonium, Maryland, Van Veen is the son of Helen and Richard Van Veen. He graduated from Wake Forest University with a degree in management and information systems in 2003.

Career 
Van Veen created CollegeHumor as a student at Wake Forest University. Van Veen's site was earning between $10–15 million a year before the partners sold a controlling stake to IAC/InterActiveCorp. He is also one of the principal owners and founders of Connected Ventures, a company formed around CollegeHumor that included Vimeo and BustedTees.

He made appearances in several College Humor video series, such as Jake and Amir and Hardly Working, and the former MTV program The CollegeHumor Show.

In July 2009 Van Veen was announced to be the CEO of the new production company, Notional, which would be producing material for the traditional media of television. One of Notional's most noteworthy TV shows is Chopped on the Food Network. Van Veen would be mentored by Barry Diller, who is the chairman and senior executive of IAC/InterActiveCorp.

Van Veen also co-founded product company Scroll Commerce in 2015, where he would invent products designed to sell online, including the popular "Homesick Candle." The company was later acquired by BuzzFeed to be the foundation of its new Product Labs division.

Personal life
Van Veen married actress Allison Williams in September 2015. On June 27, 2019, Van Veen and Williams issued a joint statement announcing their divorce.

On July 11, 2021, Van Veen married Chelsea Clinton's business partner, Caroline Kassie.

References

External links
 Ricky Van Veen Selected for Crain's New York 40 Under 40
 Ricky Van Veen: Vanity Fair: The Next Establishment

1980 births
Living people
Businesspeople from Maryland
CollegeHumor people
People from Baltimore County, Maryland
Businesspeople from New York City
Wake Forest University alumni